Question answering (QA) is a computer science discipline within the fields of information retrieval and natural language processing (NLP), which is concerned with building systems that automatically answer questions posed by humans in a natural language.

Overview
A question answering implementation, usually a computer program, may construct its answers by querying a structured database of knowledge or information, usually a knowledge base. More commonly, question answering systems can pull answers from an unstructured collection of natural language documents.

Some examples of natural language document collections used for question answering systems include:

 a local collection of reference texts
 internal organization documents and web pages
 compiled newswire reports
 a set of Wikipedia pages
 a subset of World Wide Web pages

Types of question answering
Question answering research attempts to deal with a wide range of question types including: fact, list, definition, How, Why, hypothetical, semantically constrained, and cross-lingual questions.
 Answering questions related to an article in order to evaluate Reading comprehension. This is a simpler form of question answering since the given article is relatively short compared to other types of question answering problems dealing with larger domain of information. An example of an open-domain question is "What did Albert Einstein win the Nobel Prize for?" while an article about this subject is given to the system.
 Closed-book question answering: a system has memorized some facts during training and can answer questions without explicitly given a context. This is similar to humans taking closed-book exams. 
 Closed-domain question answering deals with questions under a specific domain (for example, medicine or automotive maintenance), and can exploit domain-specific knowledge frequently formalized in ontologies. Alternatively, closed-domain might refer to a situation where only a limited type of questions are accepted, such as questions asking for descriptive rather than procedural information. Question answering systems in the context of machine reading applications have also been constructed in the medical domain, for instance related to Alzheimer's disease.
 Open-domain question answering deals with questions about nearly anything, and can only rely on general ontologies and world knowledge. On the other hand, these systems usually have much more data available from which to extract the answer. An example of an open-domain question is "What did Albert Einstein win the Nobel Prize for?" while no article about this subject is given to the system.

Another way to categorize question answering systems is to use the technical approached used.  There are a number of different types of QA systems, including 
 rule-based systems, 
 statistical systems, and 
 hybrid systems. 

Rule-based systems use a set of rules to determine the correct answer to a question. Statistical systems use statistical methods to find the most likely answer to a question. Hybrid systems use a combination of rule-based and statistical methods.

History
Two early question answering systems were BASEBALL and LUNAR. BASEBALL answered questions about Major League Baseball league over a period of one year. LUNAR, in turn, answered questions about the geological analysis of rocks returned by the Apollo moon missions. Both question answering systems were very effective in their chosen domains. In fact, LUNAR was demonstrated at a lunar science convention in 1971 and it was able to answer 90% of the questions in its domain posed by people untrained on the system. Further restricted-domain question answering systems were developed in the following years. The common feature of all these systems is that they had a core database or knowledge system that was hand-written by experts of the chosen domain. The language abilities of BASEBALL and LUNAR used techniques similar to ELIZA and DOCTOR, the first chatterbot programs.

SHRDLU was a highly successful question-answering program developed by Terry Winograd in the late 1960s and early 1970s. It simulated the operation of a robot in a toy world (the "blocks world"), and it offered the possibility of asking the robot questions about the state of the world. Again, the strength of this system was the choice of a very specific domain and a very simple world with rules of physics that were easy to encode in a computer program.

In the 1970s, knowledge bases were developed that targeted narrower domains of knowledge. The question answering systems developed to interface with these expert systems produced more repeatable and valid responses to questions within an area of knowledge. These expert systems closely resembled modern question answering systems except in their internal architecture. Expert systems rely heavily on expert-constructed and organized knowledge bases, whereas many modern question answering systems rely on statistical processing of a large, unstructured, natural language text corpus.

The 1970s and 1980s saw the development of comprehensive theories in computational linguistics, which led to the development of ambitious projects in text comprehension and question answering. One example of such a system was the Unix Consultant (UC), developed by Robert Wilensky at U.C. Berkeley in the late 1980s. The system answered questions pertaining to the Unix operating system. It had a comprehensive hand-crafted knowledge base of its domain, and it aimed at phrasing the answer to accommodate various types of users. Another project was LILOG, a text-understanding system that operated on the domain of tourism information in a German city. The systems developed in the UC and LILOG projects never went past the stage of simple demonstrations, but they helped the development of theories on computational linguistics and reasoning.

Specialized natural language question answering systems have been developed, such as EAGLi for health and life scientists.

Applications
QA systems are used in a variety of applications, including 
 Fact-checking if a fact is verified by posing a question like: is fact X true or false? 
 customer service, 
 technical support,
 market research,
 generate reports or conduct research.

Architecture
As of 2001, question answering systems typically included a question classifier module that determines the type of question and the type of answer.

Different types of question answering systems employ different architectures. For example, modern open-domain question answering systems may use a retriever-reader architecture. The retriever is aimed at retrieving relevant documents related to a given question, while the reader is used for inferring the answer from the retrieved documents. Latest systems, such as GPT-3, T5, and BART, even use an end-to-end architecture in which a transformer-based architecture is used to store large-scale textual data in the underlying parameters. These models can then be directly used to answer questions without accessing any external knowledge sources.

Question answering methods
Question answering is very dependent on a good search corpus—for without documents containing the answer, there is little any question answering system can do. It thus makes sense that larger collection sizes generally lend well to better question answering performance, unless the question domain is orthogonal to the collection. The notion of data redundancy in massive collections, such as the web, means that nuggets of information are likely to be phrased in many different ways in differing contexts and documents, leading to two benefits:

 By having the right information appear in many forms, the burden on the question answering system to perform complex NLP techniques to understand the text is lessened.
 Correct answers can be filtered from false positives by relying on the correct answer to appear more times in the documents than instances of incorrect ones.

Some question answering systems rely heavily on automated reasoning.

Open domain question answering

In information retrieval, an open domain question answering system aims at returning an answer in response to the user's question. The returned answer is in the form of short texts rather than a list of relevant documents. The system uses a combination of techniques from computational linguistics, information retrieval and knowledge representation for finding answers.

The system takes a natural language question as an input rather than a set of keywords, for example, "When is the national day of China?" The sentence is then transformed into a query through its logical form. Having the input in the form of a natural language question makes the system more user-friendly, but harder to implement, as there are various question types and the system will have to identify the correct one in order to give a sensible answer. Assigning a question type to the question is a crucial task, the entire answer extraction process relies on finding the correct question type and hence the correct answer type.

Keyword extraction is the first step for identifying the input question type. In some cases, there are clear words that indicate the question type directly, i.e., "Who", "Where" or "How many", these words tell the system that the answers should be of type "Person", "Location", or "Number", respectively. In the example above, the word "When" indicates that the answer should be of type "Date". POS (part-of-speech) tagging and syntactic parsing techniques can also be used to determine the answer type. In this case, the subject is "Chinese National Day", the predicate is "is" and the adverbial modifier is "when", therefore the answer type is "Date". Unfortunately, some interrogative words like "Which", "What" or "How" do not give clear answer types. Each of these words can represent more than one type. In situations like this, other words in the question need to be considered. First thing to do is to find the words that can indicate the meaning of the question. A lexical dictionary such as WordNet can then be used for understanding the context.

Once the question type has been identified, an information retrieval system is used to find a set of documents containing the correct keywords. A tagger and NP/Verb Group chunker can be used to verify whether the correct entities and relations are mentioned in the found documents. For questions such as "Who" or "Where", a named-entity recogniser is used to find relevant "Person" and "Location" names from the retrieved documents. Only the relevant paragraphs are selected for ranking.

A vector space model can be used as a strategy for classifying the candidate answers. Check if the answer is of the correct type as determined in the question type analysis stage. An inference technique can also be used to validate the candidate answers. A score is then given to each of these candidates according to the number of question words it contains and how close these words are to the candidate, the more and the closer the better. The answer is then translated into a compact and meaningful representation by parsing. In the previous example, the expected output answer is "1st Oct."

Mathematical question answering

An open source math-aware question answering system based on Ask Platypus and Wikidata was published in 2018. The system takes an English or Hindi natural language question as input and returns a mathematical formula retrieved from Wikidata as succinct answer. The resulting formula is translated into a computable form, allowing the user to insert values for the variables. Names and values of variables and common constants are retrieved from Wikidata if available. It is claimed that the system outperforms a commercial computational mathematical knowledge engine on a test set. MathQA is hosted by Wikimedia at https://mathqa.wmflabs.org/. In 2022, it was extended to answer 15 math question types.

MathQA methods need to combine natural and formula language. One possible approach is to perform supervised annotation via Entity Linking. The "ARQMath Task" at CLEF 2020 was launched to address the problem of linking newly posted questions from the platform Math Stack Exchange (MSE) to existing ones that were already answered by the community. The lab was motivated by the fact that Mansouri et al. discovered that 20% of the mathematical queries in general-purpose search engines are expressed as well-formed questions. It contained two separate sub-tasks. Task 1: "Answer retrieval" matching old post answers to newly posed questions and Task 2: "Formula retrieval" matching old post formulae to new questions. Starting with the domain of mathematics, which involves formula language, the goal is to later extend the task to other domains (e.g., STEM disciplines, such as chemistry, biology, etc.), which employ other types of special notation (e.g., chemical formulae).

Moreover, also the inverse process of mathematical question answering, i.e., mathematical question generation has researched. The PhysWikiQuiz physics question generation and test engine retrieves mathematical formulae from Wikidata together with semantic information of their constituting identifiers (names and values of variables).  The formulae are then rearranged to generate a set of formula variants. Subsequently, the variables are substitued with random values to generate a large number of different questions suitable for individual student tests. PhysWikiquiz is hosted by Wikimedia at https://physwikiquiz.wmflabs.org/.

Progress
Question answering systems have been extended in recent years to encompass additional domains of knowledge  For example, systems have been developed to automatically answer temporal and geospatial questions, questions of definition and terminology, biographical questions, multilingual questions, and questions about the content of audio, images, and video. Current question answering research topics include:

 interactivity—clarification of questions or answers
 answer reuse or caching
 semantic parsing
 answer presentation
 knowledge representation and semantic entailment
 social media analysis with question answering systems
 sentiment analysis
 utilization of thematic roles
 Image captioning for visual question answering
 Embodied question answering

In 2011, Watson, a question answering computer system developed by IBM, competed in two exhibition matches of Jeopardy! against Brad Rutter and Ken Jennings, winning by a significant margin.
Facebook Research has made their DrQA system available under an open source license. This system has been used for open domain question answering using Wikipedia as knowledge source. The open source framework Haystack by deepset allows combining open domain question answering with generative question answering and supports the domain adaptation of the underlying language models for industry use cases.

References

Further reading
 Dragomir R. Radev, John Prager, and Valerie Samn. Ranking suspected answers to natural language questions using predictive annotation . In Proceedings of the 6th Conference on Applied Natural Language Processing, Seattle, WA, May 2000.
 John Prager, Eric Brown, Anni Coden, and Dragomir Radev. Question-answering by predictive annotation . In Proceedings, 23rd Annual International ACM SIGIR Conference on Research and Development in Information Retrieval, Athens, Greece, July 2000.

 L. Fortnow, Steve Homer (2002/2003).   A Short History of Computational Complexity.  In D. van Dalen, J. Dawson, and A. Kanamori, editors, The History of Mathematical Logic. North-Holland, Amsterdam.

External links
 Question Answering Evaluation at NTCIR
 Question Answering Evaluation at TREC
 Question Answering Evaluation at CLEF
 Quiz Question Answers
 Online Question Answering System

Applications of artificial intelligence
Natural language processing
Computational linguistics
Information retrieval genres
Tasks of natural language processing
Deep learning